Kedah United FC is a Malaysian football team based in the city of Alor Setar representing the state of Kedah, Malaysia. Newly founded in 2012, the team were registered under the name of the Kedah Malays Football Association (KMFA).

Currently they play in third-tier of the football league system in Malaysia, the Malaysia FAM League. Kedah United play their home games at Langkawi Stadium located in Kuah, a town located in Langkawi Island.

Names
 2012-2014: Persatuan Bolasepak Melayu Kedah (Kedah Malays FA)
 2015: Kedah United Football Club (Kedah United F.C.)

History
Kedah Malays FC was formed following a meeting at the office of KMFA in Darul Aman Stadium on 1 February 2012 by a group of committee members headed by the KMFA's deputy president, Muhamad Shakri Mat who is now become a team manager. A paper on the establishment of the football team was presented by Syamsul Ghozi Dato Haji Ahmad, the CEO of Pan Empresa Sdn Bhd (PESB). As a result of the presentation, all committee members are satisfied and have agreed that a team will represent under the name KMFA to join the FAM League in 2013 season with all the administration team is placed under the responsibility of the company.  The selection process for forming a team had been started on 8 September 2012 under the responsibility of the head coach, Mohamad Ramlee and monitored by a team selection panel that included the committee members of the KMFA has been charged to work out the intricacies of assembling a team of quality players to make its debut.

However, until the end of January 2013, PESB has failed in its responsibility to manage this team; especially in terms of financial allocations and it caused KMFA to intervene to save the reputation of the team. And with effect from 1 February 2013, the management of Kedah United has fully returned to KMFA by the contracts and agreements with PESB is automatically cancelled as a result of such failure. Kedah United name also died and the name of 'PB Melayu Kedah' reused to meet the 2013 Malaysia FAM League. String of the problem has led Mohamad Ramlee leaving the team to become an assistant coach for Kedah President Cup team. Previous assistant coach, Roshidi Shaari lifted as a head coach and Husin Jaafar was brought in as the new assistant coach.

The team
Apart from the main mission to join the 2013 FAM League, the team also developed to deal with the 72nd edition of Kings' Gold Cup tournament as a yardstick to the team's ability. Finally, the team has successfully stepped into the final match but lost 2–0 to Perak on 22 December 2012 which took place at the Perak Stadium, Ipoh, Perak. And it shows that the team will participate in FAM League 2013 is a quality team and are able to provide competition to the other teams.

Colour and crest
The ideas of the current PB Melayu Kedah colours and crest also came from the "Father of Football" of Kedah, Ahmad Basri Akil when he was the president of KMFA.

The team and association colours are red, green and yellow. Red, green and yellow are also the colours that are on the Kedah Darul Aman's flag and coat of arms. Red taken in conjunction with the background colour and the main colour of the Kedah's flag also symbolise courage and determination in the fight. Meanwhile, green and yellow are the official color of the sport for the state of Kedah, which also depict images that are fresh, healthy and honest in all sports participation, especially football.

The crest was designed on an oval shape with elements such as paddy and kris. A yellow paddy describe the image of the state as the 'Rice Bowl of Malaysia'. Sheathed kris as a weapon which symbolises the tradition and the application of the Malays since antiquity; well reflect strong fighting spirit and strong in the face of challenges. The figure of '1948' is the year the association was established.

Players

Current squad
Until 31 October 2015.

Transfer
For recent transfers, see List of Malaysian football transfers 2016

In

Club officials
Senior officials

Team officials

References

External links
 PB Melayu Kedah Facebook Page
 PB Kedah Blogspot

Football clubs in Malaysia